Gerry Thompkins (born c. 1937) was a Canadian football player who played for the Ottawa Rough Riders and Montreal Alouettes. He won the Grey Cup with the Rough Riders in 1960. He played college football at Texas A&M University–Kingsville.

References

1930s births
Ottawa Rough Riders players
Living people
People from Honey Grove, Texas
Players of American football from Texas
Canadian football quarterbacks
Montreal Alouettes players